Leif Hansson (born 18 March 1946) is a Swedish former cyclist. He competed at the 1972 Summer Olympics and the 1976 Summer Olympics. His sporting career began with IK Vinco Ystad.

References

External links
 

1946 births
Living people
Swedish male cyclists
Olympic cyclists of Sweden
Cyclists at the 1972 Summer Olympics
Cyclists at the 1976 Summer Olympics
Sportspeople from Skåne County